Neoconservatism: Why We Need It is a 2006 book by Douglas Murray, in which the author argues that neoconservatism offers a coherent platform from which to tackle genocide, dictatorships and human rights abuses in the modern world, that the terms neoconservativism and neocon are often both misunderstood and misrepresented, and that neoconservativism can play a progressive role in the context of modern British politics.

The book was described by the Social Affairs Unit as "a vigorous defence of the most controversial political philosophy of our age".

Background
In a 2006 interview, Murray explained that he had written the book

Synopsis 
In the book's introduction, Murray writes, "Neoconservatism is not a political party, or social set, but a way of looking at the world. It is a deeply rooted and relevant philosophy which only seems to be out of kilter with modern thought because there is so little modern thought."

The book is divided into four parts: "Neoconservatism in Theory", "Neoconservatism in Practice", "Relativism and the Iraq War", and "Neoconservatism in America".

In 2006, Melanie Phillips summarised the book's main contentions as follows:
The US political philosopher Leo Strauss's work was distorted for politically motivated reasons, and his influence in creating neoconservatism exaggerated.
Neoconservatism's defining characteristic is moral clarity and "its recognition of the evils of moral collapse both in the domestic agenda of moral relativism and abroad."
US foreign policy after 9/11 was not dictated by neoconservatism but brought about a confluence of thinking between neocons and old-style conservatives.
The vilification of neoconservatism by so-called liberals in Europe and the US derives from desperation that only neocons have coherent policies for tackling genocide, dictatorships and human rights abuses, but the liberals had none.
Opposition to the Iraq war was fuelled by moral equivalence, hatred of Israel and a media vendetta biased against the West.
Neoconservatism should offer a way forward for the British Conservative Party, which, in its current state, is the antithesis of the neoconservative ideal.

Reception

At the ConservativeHome website, Jeremy Brier wrote that "His confident and scholarly homage to neoconservatism is both an exhibition of and an argument for moral clarity" and

Brier concludes: "This outstanding short book, always written with wit, elegance and flair, enables one not just to understand better the world in which we live, but to understand with a burning clarity our own duties and responsibilities within it".

Journalist Christopher Hitchens wrote in the Washington Examiner that "The word 'neoconservative' is itself a joke that has gone too far ... Quite plainly, a political faction that advocates the subversion of the status quo cannot reasonably be termed 'conservative' in any sense" but that Murray

In a more circumspect review in The Weekly Standard, Peter Berkowitz wrote that Murray's "optimism and boldness, it must be said, sometimes lead him to overstate his case or gloss over difficulties, not least in his estimate of neoconservatism's contemporary appeal" and

See also
 British neoconservatism

References

Footnotes

Bibliography

External links
  A discussion of the book in the New Statesman by John Lloyd
  Review and synopsis of the book by Amir Taheri in Asharq Al-Awsat
  Interview with Douglas Murray in The Stanford Review about many of the themes contained in the book

2006 non-fiction books
Neoconservatism
Books about neoconservatism
Books by Douglas Murray (author)
Conservative media in the United Kingdom
Encounter Books books
English-language books
Neoconservatism